Bicinicco is a comune (municipality) in the Province of Udine in the Italian region Friuli-Venezia Giulia, located about  northwest of Trieste and about  south of Udine.

Bicinicco borders the following municipalities: Castions di Strada, Gonars, Mortegliano, Pavia di Udine, Santa Maria la Longa.

References

External links
 Official website

Cities and towns in Friuli-Venezia Giulia